Cham Kuh Rural District is a rural district (dehestan) in Bagh-e Bahadoran District, Lenjan County, Isfahan Province, Iran. At the 2006 census, its population was 6,362, in 1,578 families.  The rural district has 9 villages.

References 

Rural Districts of Isfahan Province
Lenjan County